Grace Perreiah (born 1936) is an American artist from Lexington, Kentucky known for her serigraph prints depicting historic buildings in Kentucky, and other subjects.

Early life and education
Perreiah was born in Los Angeles, California. She received a BA in art from Immaculate Heart College in Los Angeles, where she studied under Corita Kent. She attended graduate school at Indiana University and studied in Italy. Later, she studied the history of architecture, historic preservation, and interior design at the University of Kentucky.

Career
In 1967, Perreiah moved to Lexington, Kentucky, and became a founding member of the Kentucky Guild of Artists and Craftsmen. Working with fine press printers in central Kentucky including Robert James Foose at Buttonwood Press, and Arthur Graham at Polyglot Press, she produced hand-printed serigraphs that illustrate limited-edition works such as her Eight Fables of Aesop (Buttonwood Press, 1969) and Elegant Homes of Lexington (Polyglot Press, 1982).

Perreiah has been a member of the Lexington Art League since 1967 and has exhibited her work in library, gallery, and museum venues across the region.

Collections
 University of Kentucky Libraries, Lexington, KY, USA
 New York Public Library, New York, NY, USA
 Library of Congress, Washington, DC, USA

Works and publications

References

External links
 Grace Perreiah's artisan biography at the Kentucky Artisan Center
 Grace Perreiah's profile at Payne Fine Arts

Immaculate Heart College alumni
Indiana University alumni
20th-century American artists
Artists from Kentucky
1936 births
People from Fayette County, Kentucky
Living people
20th-century American women artists
21st-century American women